The Cabinet Secretary for Environment, Climate Change and Land Reform was a cabinet post in the Scottish Government. The Cabinet Secretary was supported by the Minister for Rural Affairs and the Natural Environment, who also reported to the Cabinet Secretary for the Rural Economy.

Overview

Responsibilities
The responsibilities of the Cabinet Secretary for Environment, Climate Change and Land Reform:

 climate change and environmental protection
 biodiversity
 environmental and climate justice
 flood prevention and coastal erosion
 land use and land reform
 animal welfare
 wildlife crime
 water quality

Public bodies
The following public bodies report to the Cabinet Secretary for Environment, Climate Change and Land Reform:
 Cairngorms National Park Authority
 Crown Estate Scotland
 Drinking Water Quality Regulator
 Forestry and Land Scotland
 Loch Lomond and The Trossachs National Park Authority
 NatureScot
 Royal Botanic Garden Edinburgh
 Scottish Canals
 Scottish Environment Protection Agency
 Scottish Forestry
 Scottish Land Commission
 Scottish Water
 Water Industry Commission for Scotland

History
In the first Dewar Government, the environment brief was the responsibility of the Minister for Transport and Environment and the Deputy Minister for Fisheries and Land Reform, changing to the Minister of the Environment, Sport and Culture and the Deputy Minister for Rural Development from 2000 to 2001. From 2001 and 2007, environment was combined with the rural affairs brief for the Minister for the Environment and Rural Development, with the associated deputy post of Deputy Minister for Environment and Rural Development.

The Salmond government, elected following the 2007 Scottish Parliament election, created the junior ministerial post of the Minister for Environment who assisted the Cabinet Secretary for Rural Affairs, Food and Environment, in the Scottish Executive Environment and Rural Affairs Department. A junior minister did not attend the Scottish Cabinet unless his/her Cabinet Secretary was absent.  The Minister for Environment and Climate Change and Land Reform took the lead role in environment and natural heritage, crofting, forestry, aquaculture, sport fishing, land reform, access, water quality regulation, sustainable development and climate change. In 2010, Climate Change was added to the Environment portfolio becoming Minister for Environment and Climate Change. Land reform was added to the title in November 2014 after Nicola Sturgeon's first reshuffle on her appointment to First Minister of Scotland.

The Ministerial post was abolished in May 2016 at the beginning of the second Sturgeon government. The duties of the junior Ministerial post were upgraded to full Cabinet Secretary status at that point as the Cabinet Secretary for Environment, Climate Change and Land Reform.

List of office holders
The final Cabinet Secretary for Environment, Climate Change and Land Reform was Roseanna Cunningham.

References

External links 
Cabinet Secretary for Environment, Climate Change and Land Reform on the Scottish Government website

Environment
Environment of Scotland
Climate change in Scotland
Land reform in Scotland